Royal Air Force Blyton or more simply RAF Blyton is a former Royal Air Force satellite station located in Lincolnshire,  north east of Gainsborough, and  south of Scunthorpe, England.

It was built in 1942 and was heavily used during the Second World War but it was used little after the early stages of the Cold War.

History
 No. 199 Squadron RAF
 'B' Flight of No. 1 Lancaster Finishing School RAF (November 1943 - February 1944)
 No. 7 Air Crew Holding Unit
 Sub site of No. 61 Maintenance Unit RAF (March 1946 - ?)
 Relief Landing Ground for No. 101 Flying Refresher School RAF (October 1951 - February 1952)
 Relief Landing Ground for No. 215 Advanced Flying School RAF (February 1952 - January 1954)
 No. 1481 Target Towing and Gunnery Flight RAF (September - November 1942)
 No. 1662 Heavy Conversion Unit RAF (January 1943 - April 1945)
 No. 2797 Squadron RAF Regiment
 Air Bomber Training Flight, No. 1 Group (September - November 1942)

Current use
It is now used for off-road racing cars, rally driving and test running refurbished and/or new designs of trucks.

See also
List of former Royal Air Force stations

References

Citations

Bibliography

External links
Geograph.org.uk

Royal Air Force stations in Lincolnshire
Royal Air Force stations of World War II in the United Kingdom